Ang Peng Siong (born 27 October 1962 in Singapore) is a swimmer from Singapore, who once held World Number 1 ranking in the 50 m freestyle. As of 2012, he is Singapore's Swimming National Head Coach.

Ang was ranked fifth in a list of Singapore's 50 Greatest Athletes of the Century by The Straits Times in 1999.

Biography

Ang learned to swim at the age of five, taught by his father at the Farrer Park Swimming Complex, Ang Teck Bee (Chinese: 洪德美). The senior Ang was an athlete who represented Singapore in Judo at the 1964 Tokyo Olympic Games.  He graduated from the University of Houston in 1985 and studied at Anglo-Chinese Junior School, Anderson Secondary School and Anglo-Chinese School.

Ang first represented Singapore at the 1977 Southeast Asian Games in Kuala Lumpur, where he won a silver medal in the 4 × 100 m freestyle relay.

His first major international competition was the Hawaii International Invitational Swimming Championship, an event which included many top swimmers from countries that boycotted the 1980 Summer Olympic Games in Moscow. He clocked a personal best timing of 23.22 seconds in the 50 m freestyle, placing fourth in the meet. As a result of his performance in Hawaii, Ang received an offer for a full athletic scholarship from American swimming coaches Phil Hansel and Jim Montgomery to study physical education at the University of Houston.

World's fastest Swimmer
In 1982, at the US Swimming Championships, Ang won the 50 m freestyle in 22.69 seconds. Ang represented Singapore at the 1982 Asian Games in New Delhi, and won gold in the 100 m freestyle. He was presented with the 'World's Fastest Swimmer' award for 1982.

In 1983, Ang won the 50-yard freestyle race at the NCAA Division One Swimming Championships. He was the 50-yard champion at the US Swimming Championships in 1982 and 1986, and was named an All-American for four consecutive years from 1981 to 1984.

1984 Olympics and after

Ang represented Singapore at the 1984 Summer Olympics in Los Angeles, where he won the 'B' consolation final in the 100 m freestyle. (He was not able to compete in his pet event, the 50 m freestyle, as it was not an Olympic event until 1988.)

At the 1986 World Swimming Championships in Madrid, Ang finished fourth in the 50 m freestyle.

In eight competitions at the Southeast Asian Games from 1977 to 1993, Ang won a total of 20 gold medals. He held the Asian record in the 50 metres freestyle up until 1996. His time of 22.69 seconds stood as a Singapore national record for 33 years until Joseph Schooling broke it at the 2015 SEA Games.

Coaching

Since retiring from top-level competition, Ang has devoted himself to coaching. He has worked with swimmers at all levels – from young children just learning how to swim, to national champions preparing to represent Singapore at top international competitions. He founded the APS Swim School and the Aquatic Performance Swim Club in Singapore.  From 2009 to 2012, he was engaged as the National Head Coach for Singapore Swimming.

At the 2000 World Masters Swimming Championships, Ang won the 35–39 age group 50m freestyle event.

References

External links
 
 
 
 
 

Singaporean male freestyle swimmers
Olympic swimmers of Singapore
Swimmers at the 1984 Summer Olympics
Swimmers at the 1988 Summer Olympics
University of Houston alumni
College men's swimmers in the United States
Anglo-Chinese School alumni
Singaporean people of Hokkien descent
1962 births
Living people
Swimmers at the 1982 Commonwealth Games
Swimmers at the 1986 Commonwealth Games
Commonwealth Games competitors for Singapore
Asian Games medalists in swimming
Swimmers at the 1982 Asian Games
Swimmers at the 1986 Asian Games
Swimmers at the 1990 Asian Games
Asian Games gold medalists for Singapore
Asian Games silver medalists for Singapore
Asian Games bronze medalists for Singapore
Medalists at the 1982 Asian Games
Medalists at the 1986 Asian Games
Medalists at the 1990 Asian Games
Southeast Asian Games gold medalists for Singapore
Southeast Asian Games medalists in swimming
Competitors at the 1977 Southeast Asian Games